Dr. Pritam Gopinath Munde (born 17 February 1983) is a doctor and Indian politician who is the current Member of Parliament in the Lok Sabha from Beed. In 2014, she won with a margin of 6,96,321 votes - the highest ever in India's electoral history. She is the second daughter of former BJP leader Gopinath Munde. In 2019 elections she emerged as victorious candidate by defeating Bajrang Sonwane of Nationalist Congress Party by margin of 1.68 lakh votes.

Early life 
Pritam was born on 17 February 1983 to Central Cabinet Minister Gopinath Munde and Pradnya Munde. She has one elder sister Pankaja Munde and younger sister Yashashari. She is a niece of Pramod Mahajan, and a cousin to Rahul Mahajan and Poonam Mahajan. NCP leader Dhananjay Munde is also her cousin.

She married Gaurav Khade in 2009 and they have a son named Agastya Khade.

References

External links
Official biographical sketch in Parliament of India website
http://164.100.47.194/loksabha/members/MemberBioprofile.aspx?mpsno=4928

Lok Sabha members from Maharashtra
India MPs 2014–2019
India MPs 2019–present
Women in Maharashtra politics
Marathi politicians
People from Beed
1983 births
Living people
Bharatiya Janata Party politicians from Maharashtra
People from Marathwada
21st-century Indian women politicians
21st-century Indian politicians